The Ambassador of the United Kingdom to Israel is the United Kingdom's foremost diplomatic representative in Israel, and in charge of the UK's diplomatic mission in Israel.  The official title is His Britannic Majesty's Ambassador to the State of Israel.

Heads of Missions

High Commissioners (Palestine under British Mandate)

1920–1925: Sir Herbert Samuel
1925–1928: Sir Herbert Plumer
1928: Sir Harry Luke (acting)
1928–1931: Sir John Chancellor
1931–1938: Sir Arthur Wauchope
1938–1944: Sir Harold MacMichael
1944–1945: John Vereker, 6th Viscount Gort
1945–1948: Sir Alan Cunningham

Ambassadors

1948–1949: No representation
1949–1951: Sir Knox Helm
1951–1954: Sir Francis Evans
1954–1957: Sir John Walter Nicholls
1957–1959: Sir Francis Rundall
1959–1963: Sir Patrick Hancock
1963–1965: Sir John Beith
1965–1969: Sir Michael Hadow
1969–1972: Sir Ernest John Ward Barnes
1972–1975: Sir Bernard Ledwidge
1975–1976: Thomas Anthony Keith Elliott
1976–1980: Sir John Mason
1980–1981: John Robinson
1981–1984: Sir Patrick Moberly
1984–1988: Dr William Squire     
1988–1992: Mark Elliott
1992–1995: Sir Andrew Burns
1995–1998: Sir David Manning
1998–2001: Francis Cornish
2001–2003: Sir Sherard Cowper-Coles
2003–2006: Simon McDonald, Baron McDonald of Salford
2006–2010: Sir Tom Phillips
2010–2015: Matthew Gould
2015–2019: David Quarrey

2019–: Neil Wigan

See also
 Israel–United Kingdom relations

References

External links
UK and Israel, gov.uk

Israel
 
United Kingdom